Air Vice Marshal Michael John Harwood,  (born 29 October 1958) is a retired senior Royal Air Force officer who served as Defence Attaché and Head of the British Defence Staff – US in Washington, D.C. from 2008 to 2011.

RAF career

Educated at Merchant Taylors' School and at King's College London (MA Defence Studies), Harwood joined the RAF as a fast-jet pilot in 1978, initially serving as a flying instructor on Hawk and Harrier GR3/T4 aircraft. He received the Queen's Commendation for Valuable Service in the Air in December 1990. Promoted to wing commander, he became Commanding Officer of No. 20 Squadron (Harrier Operational Conversion Unit) at RAF Wittering in 1998 and, following promotion to group captain, he became Commander British Forces (Gulf) in Saudi Arabia in 2000. He went on to be Station Commander, RAF Cottesmore in 2001 before being deployed as Operating Base Commander, Kuwait for Operation Telic in 2003. He joined the Public Relations Directorate at the Ministry of Defence in 2004, became Assistant Commandant (Air) at the Joint Services Command and Staff College in 2005 and was the appointed Chief of the ISAF Detachment, CENTAF Combined Air Operations Centre at Al Udeid with the rank of air commodore in September 2007.

Harwood became Air Officer Commanding No. 83 Expeditionary Air Group, Al Udeid in 2008. He was promoted air vice marshal and appointed Head of the British Defence Staff – US and Defence Attaché in November 2008. He was appointed Companion of the Order of the Bath in the 2012 New Year Honours.

References

|-

|-

1958 births
Living people
People educated at Merchant Taylors' School, Northwood
Alumni of King's College London
Royal Air Force air marshals
British air attachés
Commanders of the Order of the British Empire
Recipients of the Commendation for Valuable Service in the Air
Companions of the Order of the Bath